Sarsai is a village in Junagadh district, Gujarat, India

Sarsai can also refer to:
 Sarsai Nawar, a village in Etawah district, Uttar Pradesh, India
 Sarsai Nawar Wetland, a bird sanctuary
 Sarsaina, a village in Rajasthan